Reşit Kaynak (12 August 1952 – 26 March 1999) was a Turkish footballer best known for his stints in the Turkish Süper Lig with Adanaspor.

Reşit was a prolific goalscorer in the top divisions of Turkey, and was briefly an international footballer for Turkey.

Death
Reşit died on 26 March 1999 of a heart attack, the same condition that killed his brothers Kayhan and İrfan.

Personal life
Reşit was born in to a large family of 8 children. His brothers Orhan, Kayhan, İrfan, İlhan and Ayhan were all professional footballers.

References

External links
 
  (as coach)
 
 

1952 births
1999 deaths
People from Adana
Turkish footballers
Turkey international footballers
Turkey youth international footballers
Adanaspor footballers
Beşiktaş J.K. footballers
Diyarbakırspor footballers
Galatasaray S.K. footballers
Gaziantepspor footballers
Gençlerbirliği S.K. footballers
Hatayspor footballers
Süper Lig players
TFF First League players
Association football forwards